Louis-Philippe McGraw (born October 26, 1971 in
Sainte-Rose, New Brunswick) is a lawyer in the province of New Brunswick, Canada. He is a former member of the Legislative Assembly of New Brunswick, having served from 1999 to 2003. In 2008 he was appointed Commissioner and Vice-President of the National Parole Board.

McGraw studied at the University of Moncton, graduating with  
Bachelor of Business Administration, Bachelor of Laws, and Master of Business Administration degrees. He was admitted to the Bar of New Brunswick in 1997 and set up a law practice in Saint-Isidore.

Louis-Philippe McGraw began his involvement in politics as a Liberal and was youth chair of Bernard Richard's unsuccessful bid for the Liberal leadership in 1998.  He joined the Progressive Conservative Party of New Brunswick and was elected to the 54th New Brunswick Legislative Assembly in 1999 to represent the electoral district of Centre-Péninsule.

He was defeated in a bid for re-election in 2003 by Denis Landry, whom McGraw had defeated in 1999.  McGraw was defeated in a third rematch against Landry in the 2006 election.

From the 2006 federal election until the provincial campaign later that year, McGraw served as an advisor to federal cabinet minister Greg Thompson.

References 

1971 births
Living people
Université de Moncton alumni
Lawyers in New Brunswick
Progressive Conservative Party of New Brunswick MLAs
People from Gloucester County, New Brunswick
Université de Moncton École de droit alumni
21st-century Canadian politicians